Raoul Coulon (born 3 December 1995) is a Vanuatuan footballer who can play as a right back, central defender and as a defensive midfielder. He plays for Vanuatuan clubside Nalkutan in the Port Vila Football League. He made his debut for the national team on March 26, 2016 in their 2–1 win against New Caledonia.

Personal life
Raoul has a twin brother, Michel, who also plays for Tupuji Imere as well as various national youth teams. They played together at the 2010 Summer Youth Olympics.

References

External links
 

Living people
1995 births
Vanuatuan footballers
Vanuatu international footballers
Vanuatu under-20 international footballers
Vanuatu youth international footballers
Association football defenders
Footballers at the 2010 Summer Youth Olympics
Twin sportspeople
Vanuatuan twins
People from Port Vila
Nalkutan F.C. players
2016 OFC Nations Cup players